Nebílovy is a municipality and village in Plzeň-South District in the Plzeň Region of the Czech Republic. It has about 400 inhabitants.

Sights
Nebílovy is known for the Baroque Nebílovy Castle designed by Jakub Auguston.

References

External links

Villages in Plzeň-South District